Museum of Science and Industry in Kraków was a museum in Kraków, Poland. Its name changed in 1920, and again in 1934. The museum was nationalized in 1950, and became part of the National Museum, Kraków. The building presently serves as the library of the Jan Matejko Academy of Fine Arts ("ASP").

External links 
 

Museums in Kraków
Museums established in 1868
Defunct museums in Poland